Campbell College was a college in Holton, Kansas, United States. It opened in 1880 and closed in 1933.

History
It was initially planned in 1870 and opened in 1880 with a large part of the funding provided by Allen G. Campbell, a wealthy Utah mine owner and former Jackson County, Kansas, resident, for whom it was named. It initially operated under the name of Campbell Normal University. Campbell was approached for money to start a college. Campbell offered to match up to $20,000 and $10,000 was raised locally. Eleven acres of land was purchased and a stone building was erected in 1880.

In 1902 the United Brethren purchased Campbell and merged it with Lane University and the combined institution became Campbell University. It received another $100,000 donation from Mr. Campbell at this point. It then received pledges of financial support from the United Brethren churches in Oklahoma, Kansas and Missouri.

By 1910 there were 500 students. Thomas D. Crites was the president of the college. In 1913 there were merger talks between the United Brethren and Methodist Protestants, trustees of Campbell agreed to merge with Kansas City University in Kansas City, Kansas.

The school fielded a college football team for 14 seasons from 1898 to 1915.

Kansas City University failed in 1933 due to financial difficulties.

References

External links
 Holton High School, located at the site of the former main building of Campbell College.

Defunct private universities and colleges in Kansas
Education in Jackson County, Kansas
1870 establishments in Kansas
1933 disestablishments in Kansas
Educational institutions established in 1870
Educational institutions disestablished in 1933